Diego Chávez Collins (born 11 May 1995) is a Mexican professional footballer who plays as a midfielder for Liga MX club Juárez.

Club career
On 11 August 2015, Chávez made his official debut in the Liga MX with Veracruz against Club Tijuana in an away game celebrated in the Estadio Caliente. Chávez came in as a substitute at minute 75' and score the 3rd goal for the Tiburones, the game ended-up 1–3 to Veracruz.

References

External links
Diego Chavez at Official Liga MX Profile
Diego Chavez at Soccerway

1995 births
Living people
Mexican footballers
Footballers from Veracruz
Association football midfielders
Liga MX players
Ascenso MX players
C.D. Veracruz footballers
FC Juárez footballers
Club Necaxa footballers
Segunda División B players
Salamanca CF UDS players
Mexican expatriate footballers
Mexican expatriate sportspeople in Spain
Expatriate footballers in Spain